is a Japanese athlete specialising in the high hurdles. He finished fourth at the 2017 Summer Universiade.

His personal best in the 110 metres hurdles was 13.34 (+0.3 m/s) set in Machida in 2020, until his 13.16 (+1.7) national record set in Hiroshima in 2021.

International competitions

1Representing Asia-Pacific

References

1995 births
Living people
People from Hakodate
Sportspeople from Hokkaido
Japanese male hurdlers
Asian Games competitors for Japan
Athletes (track and field) at the 2018 Asian Games
Competitors at the 2017 Summer Universiade
World Athletics Championships athletes for Japan
Japan Championships in Athletics winners
Athletes (track and field) at the 2020 Summer Olympics
Olympic athletes of Japan
20th-century Japanese people
21st-century Japanese people